West Allegheny Senior High School is a public high school located in the West Allegheny School District in Allegheny County, Pennsylvania, United States. The school serves students in grades 9-12 from Findlay Township, North Fayette Township, and the Oakdale Borough. West Allegheny Senior High School and West Allegheny Middle School are located on the main campus on West Allegheny Road in North Fayette, PA.

Extracurricular activities
The district offers a variety of clubs, activities and sports. The school's football team has gained notability by reaching play-off status during past years, and play divisional play-off games in Heinz Field.  Through the 1960s and 1970s West Allegheny shared an intense rivalry with Fort Cherry School District.

The West Allegheny Softball team is also a notable sport as they made WPIAL 5A history by being the first 5A district champion after the WPIAL broke into six classifications. The softball team also won the first WPIAL championship in its programs history. The softball team went on to win three titles in a row from 2017-2019.

References

External links
West Allegheny High School

Public high schools in Pennsylvania
Schools in Allegheny County, Pennsylvania